Cryptomella is a genus of sea snails, marine gastropod mollusks, unassigned to a family within the superfamily Conoidea.

Species
Species within the genus Cryptomella include:
 Cryptomella ebor (Okutani, 1968)
 Cryptomella oceanica (Dall, 1908)
 † Cryptomella transenna (Suter, 1917)

References

 Higo, S. & Goto, Y. (1993) A Systematic List of Molluscan Shells from the Japanese Is. and the Adjacent Area. Elle Scientific Publications, Yao, Japan, xxii + 693 + 13 + 149 pp

External links
 Dall W.H. (1908). Reports on the dredging operations off the west coast of Central America to the Galapagos, to the west coast of Mexico, and in the Gulf of California, in charge of Alexander Agassiz, carried on by the U.S. Fish Commission steamer "Albatross," during 1891, Lieut.-Commander Z.L. Tanner, U.S.N., commanding. XXXVII. Reports on the scientific results of the expedition to the eastern tropical Pacific, in charge of Alexander Agassiz, by the U.S. Fish Commission steamer "Albatross", from October, 1904 to March, 1905, Lieut.-Commander L.M. Garrett, U.S.N., commanding. XIV. The Mollusca and Brachiopoda. Bulletin of the Museum of Comparative Zoology. 43(6): 205-487, pls 1-22

Marine gastropods
Conoidea